Oleksandr Morozov is Ukrainian version of Aleksandr Morozov and may refer to:

 Alexander Alexandrovich Morozov, a Soviet tank designer from Russia who lived and worked in Ukraine
 Oleksandr Morozov, a Ukrainian footballer